Badmeaningood Vol.3 is a compilation of tracks chosen by alternative hip hop artist Peanut Butter Wolf. The series was started by the author A. W. Wilde and released on Whoa Music / Ultimate Dilemma.

Track listing
 Peanut Butter Wolf - "Intro" – 0:54
 Grandmaster Flash - "New Adventures of Grandmaster Flash" – 0:55
 Lord Alibaski - "Top Gun" – 1:40
 Forty Five King & Louie - "Funk Box (We Want to Hear the Beat Box)" – 1:13
 Iron Butterfly - "Soul Experience" – 1:38
 Johnny Hammond - "Fantasy" – 4:17
 Roy Ayers - "Can't You See Me" - 4:57
 Alicia Myers - "Don't Stop What You're Doin'" – 2:14
 Bernard Wright - "The Master Rocker" – 3:12
 B Beat Girls - "Jungle Swing" – 4:24
 The Human League - "Hard Times" – 5:20
 Joe Jackson - "Steppin' Out" – 3:57
 Cold Crush Brothers - "Punk Rock Rap" – 1:28
 Michael White - "Let Love Be Your Magic Carpet" – 5:31
 Prince Far I - "Black Man Land" – 2:01
 Jungle Brothers - "I'm Gonna Do You" – 1:36
 Charizma and Peanut Butter Wolf - "My World Premiere" – 1:51
 Keni Burke - "Risin' to the Top" (Snowboys Acoustic Mix) – 4:24

See also 
 Badmeaningood Vol.1 (2002, by Skitz)
 Badmeaningood Vol.2 (2002, by Roots Manuva)
 Badmeaningood Vol.4 (2003, by Scratch Perverts)

Hip hop compilation albums
2003 compilation albums